(Samuel Victor Albert) Alberto Zelman (15 November 18743 March 1927) was an Australian musician and conductor, and founder of one of the predecessors to the Melbourne Symphony Orchestra.

Life and career 
Alberto Zelman was born in Melbourne, Australia. His father, Alberto Zelman (senior), had come from Trieste via India as conductor of an opera company, and settled in Melbourne.

Alberto jr. was educated at King's College, Melbourne, and showed early talent as a violinist, afterwards becoming a violin teacher. He was connected with the Melbourne Philharmonic Society for over 30 years, first as leader of the second violins in the orchestra, and from 1912 as conductor. He was leader of the British Musical Society's quartet, and after the death of George Marshall-Hall he founded (in 1906) and conducted the Albert Street Conservatorium Orchestra which, in 1927, combined with the Melbourne University Symphony Orchestra to form the Melbourne Symphony Orchestra (MSO). The MUSO was mainly amateur with a core of professional players, and Alberto conducted it over the years, giving many memorable performances.

Considering that the MUSO had no endowment, Zelman did remarkable work with it, and he was always hoping that all the musical interests in Melbourne would pool their resources so that his native city would have a permanent, properly supported orchestra.  Alberto Zelman was also well known in the Spa Country region of Victoria, and he lived for a short period in a cottage on 7th Street in Hepburn Springs that stands today and which features a frieze of the local bush painted by his artist brother Victor.

In 1922 he visited Europe, and in Berlin was invited to conduct the Berlin Philharmonic Orchestra. He was enthusiastically received, and in November of the same year conducted the London Symphony Orchestra, but was less successful than in Berlin. On returning to Australia, Zelman resumed his teaching and conducting, and his last appearance was to conduct Messiah on Christmas night 1926; such world-famous singers as John McCormack and Dame Clara Butt had been soloists in his Messiah.

He died in Melbourne after a short illness on 3 March 1927. He married Maude Harrington, a well-known singer, who survived him. He had no children. A brother, Victor Zelman, studied painting and became known as a capable painter of landscapes; an example of his work is in the National Gallery of Victoria.

The MSO continued to perform after his death until 1932 when it was taken over jointly by Professor (later Sir) Bernard Heinze and Fritz Hart, who converted it to an all-professional orchestra. In 1933 the amateur players formed their own orchestra, naming it the Zelman Memorial Symphony Orchestra after Alberto Zelman. It has given at least three concerts each year since that time and now, more than 80 years later, the Zelman Symphony continues to perform with at least four concerts each year in Melbourne and one or more in country Victoria.  The Zelman Symphony owns Alberto Zelman Jnr's Mustel celeste (celesta), circa 1890.

Works
 (Contributor) Fortunatus and the magic purse and wishing cap, or, Little King Pippin: grand operatic Christmas pantomime.
 1866 Waltes on the Pipele Opera themes
 1905 Ave Maria in B Flat
 1910 Elegie
 Crispino waltzes
 Ariel valse
 1900 Gavotte
 Sérénade Andalouse 
 The Bernhardt valse
 La juive quadrilles 
 O salutaris : a motett
 1877 Emelie polka
 Gloria tibi domine

References

Radic, Thérèse (1990). "Zelman, Samuel Victor Albert (Alberto) (1874–1927)".  Australian Dictionary of Biography, Volume 12. Online version retrieved 22 January 2016.
 Your Friend, Alberto Zelman, Don Fairweather,  (1984)

External links
 

1874 births
1927 deaths
Australian conductors (music)
Musicians from Melbourne
Australian male composers
Australian musical theatre composers
Australian people of Italian descent